Kâmuran Şipal (1926, Adana – 18 September 2019, Istanbul), was a Turkish novelist, story writer and translator.

Şipak graduated from Istanbul University Faculty of Letters, German Language Department. In the following years, he translated from German to Turkish, such German writers as Franz Kafka, Alfred Adler, Ingeborg Bachmann, Wolfgang Borchert, Heinrich Böll, Alfred Brauchle, Bertolt Brecht, Max Brod, Elias Canetti, Sigmund Freud, Gustav Hans Graber, Günter Grass, Carl Gustav Jung, Thomas Mann, Rainer Maria Rilke, Robert Musil, Bernhard Zeller, Hans Zulliger and Hermann Hesse. Şipal won the Turkish Language Association Story Contest in 1953. He received a Sait Faik Story Award for his novel named Elbiseciler Çarşısı and seven years before his death, was awarded the Orhan Kemal Novel Award (2011) for his novel named Sırrımsın Sırdaşımsın.

Works

Story 
 Beyhan (1962)
 Elbiseciler Çarşısı (1964) 
 Büyük Yolculuk (1969)
 Buhûrumeryem (1971)
 Köpek İstasyonu (1988)
 Gece Lambalarının Işığında (collective storys, YKY, 2009)

Novels 
 Demir Köprü (1998), 
 Sırrımsın Sırdaşımsın (YKY 2010).

Other 
 Çağdaş Alman Hikâyesi (1962)

References 

1926 births
People from Adana
Turkish translators
20th-century Turkish short story writers
21st-century Turkish short story writers
2019 deaths
20th-century translators